John O'Brien (6 December 1794 - 6 February 1855) was an Irish MP who represented Limerick City in the UK Parliament 1841–1852.

O'Brien was the eldest son of James O'Brien of Limerick and Margaret Long, daughter of Peter Long of Waterford. James died on 21 February 1806, and Margaret subsequently married Cornelius O'Brien (1782-1857), MP for Clare 1832-47 and 1852–57.

John is later described as of Elmvale (an unidentified place in County Clare), JP; and later of Ballinalacken, County Clare (presumably Ballinalacken Castle). In 1836, he served as High Sheriff of Clare. He was elected MP for Limerick City in 1841 (Whig Party), and was re-elected in 1847 (Repeal Association); on both occasions as first member in that two-member constituency.

In 1827, he married Ellen Murphy, daughter of Jeremiah Murphy (of Hyde Park, Cork). Their fifth son, Peter, became a lawyer and judge, and served as Lord Chief Justice of Ireland. John died in Dublin in 1855, and was interred in Francis Street Burial Ground. Ellen died on 19 December 1866, or in 1869 (sources differ), and was interred in the same place.

John's youngest brother, James, their parents' fourth son, was a lawyer, judge and politician who represented Limerick City as MP from 1854–1858.

References

1794 births
People from County Clare
1855 deaths
High Sheriffs of Clare
UK MPs 1841–1847
UK MPs 1847–1852
Whig (British political party) MPs for Irish constituencies
Members of the Parliament of the United Kingdom for County Limerick constituencies (1801–1922)
Irish Repeal Association MPs